Else Quecke (5 September 1907 – 19 June 2004) was a German actress. She appeared in more than 100 films and television shows between 1955 and 1996.

Filmography

References

External links

1907 births
2004 deaths
German film actresses
People from Duisburg